Ampelopsin, also known as dihydromyricetin and DHM, when purported as an effective ingredient in supplements and other tonics, is a flavanonol, a type of flavonoid. It is extracted from the Japanese raisin tree and found in Ampelopsis species japonica, megalophylla, and grossedentata; Cercidiphyllum japonicum;  Hovenia dulcis; Rhododendron cinnabarinum; some Pinus species; and some Cedrus species, as well as in Salix sachalinensis.

Hovenia dulcis has been used in traditional Japanese, Chinese, and Korean medicines to treat fever, parasitic infection, as a laxative, and a treatment of liver diseases, and as a hangover treatment. Methods have been developed to extract ampelopsin on a larger scale, and laboratory research has been conducted with the compound to see if it might be useful as a drug in any of the conditions for which the parent plant has been traditionally used.

Research 

Research suggests that DHM protects against  DOX-induced cardiotoxicity by inhibiting NLRP3 inflammasome activation via stimulation of the SIRT1 pathway.

In a trial of 60 patients with "nonalcoholic fatty liver disease," dihydromyricetin improved glucose and lipid metabolism and yielded potentially beneficial anti-inflammatory effects.

A study of rats demonstrated pharmacological properties of DHM which suggest it would be a therapeutic candidate to treat alcohol use disorders.

Dihydromyricetin shows poor bioavailability which limits its potential medicinal applications. 

Additional research is required before claims of human efficacy and application, necessary dosage, and solutions to poor bioavailability, are met with scientific validation.

References 

Flavanonols
Pyrogallols
Resorcinols
GABAA receptor positive allosteric modulators